Owen Davidson and Dennis Ralston were the defending champions, but did not participate together this year.

Tom Okker and Marty Riessen won the title, defeating Arthur Ashe and Charlie Pasarell 6–4, 6–4 in the final.

Seeds

Draw

Finals

Top half

Bottom half

External links
 Draw

1970 Queen's Club Championships